Esther Warkov, Ph.D. is an American activist and music researcher who has authored books and studies on music. Her scholarly articles on ethnomusicology have been featured in several journals. She and her husband Joel Levin were featured in the media for co-founding Stop Sexual Assault in Schools (SSAIS) in Portland, OR, which advocates for preventing sexual violence in K-12 schools.

Activism 
Warkov and her husband Joel Levin were widely covered by the media in 2016, including in The Huffington Post, The Washington Post, Slate, and NPR, after revealing their daughter was raped in 2012 while on a school field trip. This inspired them in 2015 to found a non-profit organization called Stop Sexual Assault in Schools (SSAIS). SSAIS educates parents about Title IX protections and teaches them how to file official complaints in response to known misconduct, which the couple said took them years to figure out. In January 2018, SSAIS was credited for creating the #MeTooK12 spinoff of the #MeToo hashtag, and is meant to raise awareness of the widespread prevalence of sexual misconduct towards children in K-12 educational settings.

Musical research 
Warkov has published many scholarly articles, recordings, articles, and reviews on how music is related to society, especially music from Irish, Welsh, and Middle Eastern cultures. Her music research has been mentioned in books such as Ethnomusicological Encounters with Music and Musicians by Timothy Rice, Jewish Topographies: Visions of Space, Traditions of Place by Julia Brauch and Anna Lipphardt, and others.

Biography 
Warkov graduated from high school when she was 16 and has three music degrees: a bachelor's degree in music from the University of California, a Fulbright scholar with a master's degree in music from the University of Wales, and also a doctorate in ethnomusicology from Israel with a specialty in Middle Eastern music. She has received many fellowships and awards, including a National Endowment for the Arts grant.

References 

Jewish activists
Women musicologists
Living people
20th-century American non-fiction writers
21st-century American non-fiction writers
American musicologists
American women musicologists
Year of birth missing (living people)
20th-century American women writers
21st-century American women writers